Happisburgh Lighthouse in Happisburgh  on the North Norfolk coast is the only independently operated lighthouse in Great Britain. It is also the oldest working lighthouse in East Anglia.

History

The building was constructed in 1790 as one of a pair of lights ("High Lighthouse" and "Low Lighthouse") and worked with the Newarp Lightvessel to guide mariners around the southern edge of the offshore Haisborough Sands. The light came from rows of oil lamps placed in front of polished reflectors.  In 1868 the lantern stage (the top-most part of the tower) was replaced with the diagonally-framed glass structure seen today (which was a new innovation at the time) and following this improvement the reflectors were replaced in each lighthouse by a large (first-order) catadioptric lens designed by Chance Brothers at Smethwick near Birmingham.

In 1871 Happisburgh's lighthouses were used for a series of trials comparing a Douglass 4-wick oil light (displayed from the low lighthouse) with a Wigham 108-jet gas light (displayed from the high lighthouse) both using the same optics; the experiments (which tested rival claims made by the principal advocates of these forms of illumination, James Nicholas Douglass and John Richardson Wigham respectively) were not conclusive and further trials later took place at South Foreland.

In order to provide a supply of coal gas for the lamp, a small gas works was established alongside the high lighthouse; the gas was manufactured using cannel coal and stored in a pair of gas holders situated behind the lighthouse. In 1872, the trial having concluded, it was decided to retain gas as the illuminant for the high lighthouse.  Beyond Happisburgh, however, Trinity House did not adopt gas as an illuminant for its lighthouses.

The low light was decommissioned and demolished in 1884 before it could be lost due to coastal erosion; its lantern and lens were reused at Southwold lighthouse.  The demolition of the low light led to the High Light being repainted with red bands, so as to differentiate it more clearly from the lighthouse at Winterton; at the same time it was also provided with an occulting mechanism to differentiate the light itself.

The light source was changed to paraffin in 1904, and then to an unwatched acetylene system in 1929; this meant that there was no further need for keepers to be permanently accommodated on site, and the keepers' cottages were then sold. In 1947 the light was electrified and given a new group flashing characteristic: three flashes every 30 seconds.

It continues to use the optic installed in 1868.

The other lighthouse - the "low light" - was  lower. Together they formed a pair of range lights that marked a safe passage around the southern end of the offshore Haisborough Sands  to a stretch of safe waters known as 'The Would'.

Independence
In 1987 Happisburgh was one of five lighthouses declared redundant by Trinity House and deactivation was planned for June 1988. Villagers organised a petition to oppose the closure, and as a result the date was postponed. Under the Merchant Shipping Act of 1894, Trinity House may dispose of a working lighthouse only to an established Lighthouse Authority. On 25 April 1990 the Happisburgh Lighthouse Act received the Royal Assent establishing the Happisburgh Lighthouse Trust as a Local Lighthouse Authority, and Happisburgh became the only independently run operational lighthouse in Great Britain.

In June 2018, the lighthouse was repainted. At a cost of £20,000, the work took two weeks by a specialist team of four painters. The 300 litres of specially mixed masonry paints used was donated by a paint company. Friends of Happisburgh Lighthouse, said: “The re-paint demonstrates our continuing commitment to maintaining Happisburgh lighthouse for future generations.”

Due to COVID-19, the Lighthouse did not open to visitors in 2020.

In popular culture
 In 1990, the lighthouse featured in an episode of the BBC TV programme Challenge Anneka. The lighthouse was repainted inside and out in 33 hours on 30–31 August 1990, with the programme airing on 15 December 1990.
 The lighthouse was used as the location for the video of Ellie Goulding's 2010 song "The Writer".
 It features prominently in the 2015 horror film AfterDeath, its beam causing terrifying flashbacks.

Gallery

See also

 List of lighthouses in England

Bibliography

References

External links

 Happisburgh Lighthouse website
 Trinity House Lighthouse Service
 An 1892 OS map, showing both the Happisburgh lighthouses ('England - Norfolk: 030/NW', Ordnance Survey 1:10,560 - Epoch 1 (1892)). Date accessed: 28 August 2010

Lighthouses completed in 1790
Towers completed in 1790
Lighthouses in Norfolk
History of Norfolk
North Norfolk
1790 establishments in England
Grade II listed lighthouses
Grade II listed buildings in Norfolk